Al-Aḥṭub is a sub-district located in the Shar'ab ar-Rawnah District, Taiz Governorate, Yemen. Al-Aḥṭub had a population of 5,124 according to the 2004 census.

References

Sub-districts in Shar'ab ar-Rawnah District